Packerton is a village located in Mahoning Township, Carbon County, Pennsylvania on the Lehigh River and U.S. Route 209 between Jim Thorpe and Lehighton. It uses the Lehighton ZIP code of 18235.

References

Unincorporated communities in Carbon County, Pennsylvania
Unincorporated communities in Pennsylvania